Mustafa Kemal Kılıç (born 25 April 1956) is a Turkish football manager and a former player who manages Şanlıurfaspor. He played as a midfielder..

References

1956 births
Living people
Turkish footballers
Association football midfielders
Adanaspor footballers
Zonguldakspor footballers
Beşiktaş J.K. footballers
Altay S.K. footballers
Kayserispor footballers
MKE Ankaragücü footballers
Bakırköyspor footballers
Turkish football managers
Konyaspor managers
Kayseri Erciyesspor managers
Karşıyaka S.K. managers
Sivasspor managers
Boluspor managers
Eskişehirspor managers
Yozgatspor managers
Adanaspor managers
Göztepe S.K. managers
MKE Ankaragücü managers
Giresunspor managers
Şanlıurfaspor managers